Giles Slade is a Canadian freelance writer and social critic, best known as author of Made to Break: Technology and Obsolescence in America.

He was born in Ottawa, Ontario, Canada, and educated at Mutchmore Public School. Slade trained as a journalist, and also worked for a time for Harlequin Enterprises, writing adventure novels. He studied at the University of Southern California, defending his doctorate in cultural history.  Slade lived and worked in the United States of America for many years. After earning his doctorate he taught at colleges and universities internationally, throughout Asia and the Persian Gulf, for another decade. He returned to Canada with his family and settled in British Columbia (2002).

His 2006 book, Made to Break: Technology and Obsolescence in America, documents the history of the planned obsolescence phenomenon in America. It won the International Publisher's Gold Medal (IPPY award) for best Environment/Ecology/Nature book of 2007, and the resulting media interest of some 200+ high profile interviews helped to spread his ideas. The book was released in a paperback edition in October 2007.

The documentary film The LightBulb Conspiracy is based in part on Giles Slade’s Made To Break: Technology and Obsolescence in America, and includes an interview with the author. It was made by Spanish filmmaker Cosima Dannoritzer and both broadcast on television in Europe, then shown at film festivals (including DOXA in Vancouver, 2012).

Slade wrote a column for Huffington Post from 2007 to 2011, and continues to publish critical perspectives and commentary in a variety of popular journals.

Books
 

Brokedown Palace (aka The North American Ark) available as chapter downloads, see Giles Slade on Scrib'd

External links
Author biography, ABCBookworld 
Author biography, Huffington Post 
Made to Break - Giles Slade - Harvard University Press
2007 Independent Publishers Book Awards 
Interview at Powells.com 
DOXA Film Festival 
The Big Disconnect - Giles Slade - Prometheus
Mother Jones article reprint cawrecycles.org 
NICHE Network in Canadian History & Environment interviews 

1953 births
American non-fiction writers
Canadian non-fiction writers
Writers from Ottawa
Writers from Vancouver
Living people
University of Southern California alumni